Aria variata alla maniera italiana in A minor, BWV 989 is a keyboard work by Johann Sebastian Bach from around 1709, recorded in the Andreas Bach Book. It consists of a  theme and 10 virtuoso variations, each of them in binary form (two sections, both repeated).

References

External links 
 Aria variata on imslp.org

Compositions by Johann Sebastian Bach
Compositions for harpsichord
Compositions for solo piano
Variations
1709 compositions
Compositions in A minor